The 2021–22 III liga was the 14th season of the fourth tier domestic division in the Polish football league system since its establishment in 2008 under its current title (III liga) and the 6th season under its current league division format. The league was operated by the Polish Football Association (PZPN).

The competition was contested by 73 clubs split geographically across 4 groups, with the winners of each group gaining promotion to the II liga. The season was played in a round-robin tournament. It began in August 2021 and ended in June 2022. The teams included semi-professional clubs (although a few are professional) and the reserve teams of professional clubs.

Format

73 teams are divided into four groups according to geographical criteria:
 Group I (Łódź – Masovian – Podlaskie – Warmian-Masurian)
 Group II (Kuyavian-Pomeranian – Greater Poland – Pomeranian – West Pomeranian)
 Group III (Lower Silesian – Lubusz – Opole – Silesian)
 Group IV (Świętokrzyskie – Lesser Poland – Lublin – Podkarpackie)

Since 2021–22 season each group of III liga is operated by Polish Football Association (PZPN), not a different voivodship football association.

Changes from last season
The following teams have changed division since the 2020–21 season.

To III liga

From III liga

League tables

Group 1

Polonia Warsaw (promoted)
Legionovia Legionowo
Świt Nowy Dwór Mazowiecki
Legia II Warsaw
Błonianka Błonie
Lechia Tomaszów Mazowiecki
ŁKS II Łódź
Ursus Warsaw
Jagiellonia II Białystok
Broń Radom
Unia Skierniewice
Pelikan Łowicz
Pilica Białobrzegi
KS Kutno (relegated)
Mamry Giżycko (relegated)
GKS Wikielec (relegated)
Znicz Biała Piska (relegated)
Sokół Aleksandrów Łódzki (relegated)
Wissa Szczuczyn (relegated)

Group 2

Kotwica Kołobrzeg
Olimpia Grudziądz
Unia Janikowo
Pogoń II Szczecin
Pogoń Nowe Skalmierzyce
Sokół Kleczew
Świt Szczecin
Zawisza Bydgoszcz
Błękitni Stargard
Polonia Środa Wielkopolska
KP Starogard Gdański
Stolem Gniewino
Jarota Jarocin
Bałtyk Gdynia
GKS Przodkowo
Bałtyk Koszalin (relegated)
Kluczevia Stargard (relegated)
Elana Toruń (dissolved)

Group 3

Zagłębie II Lubin (promoted)
Ślęza Wrocław
Polonia Bytom
Rekord Bielsko-Biała
LKS Goczałkowice-Zdrój
Miedź II Legnica
Górnik II Zabrze
Pniówek Pawłowice
Stal Brzeg
Lechia Zielona Góra
Odra Wodzisław Śląski
MKS Kluczbork
Gwarek Tarnowskie Góry
Carina Gubin
Warta Gorzów Wielkopolski
Piast Żmigród (relegated)
Karkonosze Jelenia Góra (relegated)
Foto-Higiena Gać (relegated)

Group 4

Siarka Tarnobrzeg (promoted)
Chełmianka Chełm
ŁKS Łagów
Avia Świdnik
Podhale Nowy Targ
Cracovia II
Stal Stalowa Wola
KSZO 1929 Ostrowiec Świętokrzyski
Unia Tarnów
Wisłoka Dębica
Orlęta Radzyń Podlaski
Czarni Połaniec
Sokół Sieniawa
Podlasie Biała Podlaska
Wisła Sandomierz
Korona Rzeszów (relegated)
Tomasovia Tomaszów Lubelski (relegated)
Wólczanka Wólka Pełkińska (relegated)

See also
 2021–22 Ekstraklasa
 2021–22 I liga
 2021–22 II liga
 2021–22 Polish Cup

References

External link
 Official website 

2021–22
2021–22 in Polish football
Poland